HMS Coreopsis was a , built for the Royal Navy during the Second World War which served in the Battle of the Atlantic.
In 1943, she was transferred to the Royal Hellenic Navy as RHNS Kriezis and participated in the 1944 Invasion of Normandy. Shortly before she was scrapped, she took part in the British war film, The Cruel Sea.

Service
Coreopsis was built at A. & J. Inglis Ltd in Glasgow as part of the 1939 War Emergency Programme for the Royal Navy. One of the early Flower-class corvettes, she was ordered on 25 July 1939, and laid down on 19 September. She was launched on 23 April 1940 and commissioned on 17 August.

Royal Navy
In Royal Navy service, Coreopsis was employed on convoy escort duty in the Atlantic. On 16 November 1942, she rescued 169 survivors from the British merchant ship SS Clan MacTaggart that was sunk by U-92 off Cadiz. On 5 March 1943, she picked up survivors from the British merchant ships SS Fidra, SS Ger-y-Bryn and SS Trefusis which had been sunk by U-130 northwest of Lisbon.

Royal Hellenic Navy

Coreopsis was transferred to the Royal Hellenic Navy on 1 November 1943, one of several British escort vessels transferred to Greece after April 1941. Renamed Kriezis (after the naval hero Antonios Kriezis) but retaining her K32 pennant number, she served as a convoy escort out of Liverpool and on 13 June 1944, escorted Convoy ECM6 which was part of Operation Neptune, the maritime element of the Normandy Landings. She joined the British Mediterranean Fleet in October 1944. She remained with the Greek navy after the war and was finally returned to the Royal Navy on 1 June 1952.

Filming and disposal 
While awaiting disposal at Malta in 1952, Coreopsis was acquired by Ealing Studios for the film The Cruel Sea, in which she took the part of the fictional Flower-class corvette, HMS Compass Rose. During filming at Plymouth, she collided with the destroyer  causing some damage to the latter. She finally arrived at the breaker's yard of Thomas Young & Sons in Sunderland on 22 July 1952 where she was scrapped.

References

Flower-class corvettes of the Royal Navy
Flower-class corvettes of the Hellenic Navy
1940 ships
Ships built in Glasgow
Corvettes of the Cold War